The United States Revenue Act of 1943 increased federal excise taxes on, among other things, alcohol, jewelry, telephones, and admissions, and raised the excess profits tax rate from 90% to 95%.

The 5% Victory Tax was lowered to 3%, and the postwar credit repealed.

References

United States federal taxation legislation
1943 in law